René Hannemann (born 9 October 1968 in Belzig, Bezirk Potsdam) is a German bobsledder who competed in the early 1990s. Competing in two Winter Olympics, he won two medals in the four-man event with a silver in 1992 and a bronze in 1994.

Hannemann also won four medals at the FIBT World Championships with two golds (Four-man: 1995, 1997) and two bronzes (Two-man: 1991, 1993).

References
 Bobsleigh four-man Olympic medalists for 1924, 1932-56, and since 1964
 Bobsleigh two-man world championship medalists since 1931
 Bobsleigh four-man world championship medalists since 1930

1968 births
Living people
People from Bad Belzig
People from Bezirk Potsdam
German male bobsledders
Sportspeople from Brandenburg
Olympic bobsledders of Germany
Bobsledders at the 1992 Winter Olympics
Bobsledders at the 1994 Winter Olympics
Olympic silver medalists for Germany
Olympic bronze medalists for Germany
Olympic medalists in bobsleigh
Medalists at the 1992 Winter Olympics
Medalists at the 1994 Winter Olympics
Recipients of the Silver Laurel Leaf